Henry Joe Sakala  is a Zambian actor, writer, producer and director known for his leading role in a short film Guns and Rings and writer of the screenplay for the 2009 film, Reflection of Sadness.

Early life and education 
Sakala attended Rokana Primary School in Kitwe from 1986 to 1992 and then proceeded to Libala Boys Secondary School from 1993 to 1997 in Lusaka where he completed his GCE Ordinary Levels. He further attended college at Evelyn Hone College of Applied Arts and Commerce from 1999 to 2001 where he studied Diploma in Journalism and Public Relations and also obtained a Certificate in Video Production and Editing.

Career 
Sakala worked for TL STUDIOS and Post Newspapers as a reporter January 2002 to October 2003. He later joined one of Zambia's biggest private television station, Muvi TV.

Whilst at Muvi, he worked as a trainer for TV producers and Journalists on the 10 media formats; on how one can combine them and use them effectively to produce news stories and programs that have a balance in emotional appeal and information. He also performed the duties of a Production Manager, where he supervised all the productions of drama and feature films and documentaries. He wrote scripts for both the feature films and drama series and in some cases directed and produced them. He also managed the Kids News Department and was involved in production of children's programs. He was the chairman of an international children's smart TV program exchange network which comprises producers from TV stations in Kenya, Tanzania, Uganda and Namibia. He was also the editor in chief of the ZKids News Programme and Zkids Extra supported by Free Press Unlimited and HIVOS, respectively.

Awards and honours
Sakala won his first Ngoma Award for the play, Living With the Enemy which he wrote in 2001. He also won an award for the short film Guns and Rings in 2006.

Filmography 

Mfuti (2017)
Silent Voice  
Guns and Rings
When The Curtain Falls 
Reflection of Sadness 
Street Circles
Redemption
Rewind 
The Red Bag 
LSK Heroes 
Survivors 
Dancers

Bibliography 

 Unmasked: A Collection Of Short Stories And Poems (2017)

References

External links 
Henry Joe Sakala Facebook

Living people
People from Lusaka
Year of birth missing (living people)